Cerithiopsis annae is a species of very small sea snail, a marine gastropod mollusk in the family Cerithiopsidae. This species was described by Cecalupo and Buzzurro in 2005.

References

annae
Gastropods described in 2005